Augustin Dontenwill (June 4, 1857 – November 30, 1931) was the Roman Catholic Oblates of Mary Immaculate (OMI) priest, who became Archbishop of Vancouver, British Columbia, Canada, from 1899 to 1908.

Curriculum vitae
Augustin Dontenwill was born on June 4, 1857, in Bischwiller, Alsace, France; where he came to the United States, as a child.

Ordination
In 1885, Augustin Dontenwill became an Oblates of Mary Immaculate priest.

Consecration
In 1897, Dontenwill became consecrated as bishop and came to New Westminster to become Coadjutor Bishop of New Westminster and by 1899, he became Bishop of New Westminster. In 1908 he resigned as Bishop of New Westminster, to take charge as Superior General of the Oblates of Mary Immaculate.

Dontenwill died on November 30, 1931, as  Bishop Emeritus of New Westminster.

Legacy
 Founder of the Holy Rosary church, in Vancouver, British Columbia, Canada (which is known today as Holy Rosary Cathedral).

Service to God
 Priest for 47 years
 Bishop for 34 years

Notes
In 1908, there was a name change, from Bishop of New Westminster, to Archbishop of Vancouver (the diocese was raised to an archdiocese).

References

External links
 Archdiocese of Vancouver former bishops
 Catholic Hierarchy

20th-century Roman Catholic archbishops in Canada
Roman Catholic bishops of New Westminster
Roman Catholic archbishops of Vancouver
Missionary Oblates of Mary Immaculate
1857 births
1931 deaths
French emigrants to Canada